Russian House may refer to:

 Pauline Laws, also known as Russian house law
 Russian House, Reed College, Portland, Oregon
 Russian Center of Science and Culture, Belgrade
 All Russian Co-operative Society ARCOS, London